"Run Up" (stylized as "Run up") is a song by Japanese singer-songwriter Rina Aiuchi. It was released on 27 June 2001 through Giza Studio, as the second single from her second studio album Power of Words. The song served as the theme song to the Japanese television show Koko ga Hen da yo Nihonjin. The song reached number seven in Japan and has sold over 71,840 copies nationwide.

Track listing

Charts

Certification and sales

|-
! scope="row"| Japan (RIAJ)
| 
| 71,840 
|-
|}

Release history

References

2001 singles
2001 songs
J-pop songs
Songs written by Aika Ohno
Song recordings produced by Daiko Nagato
Songs written by Rina Aiuchi